Bilateral relations exist between Austria and Turkmenistan. Turkmenistan maintains an embassy in Vienna, where the current Ambassador of Turkmenistan to Austria is Mr. Nurberdiyev Sylapberdi Ashyrgeldiyevich. Austria has an embassy with residence in Astana (Kazakhstan) where the current Ambassador of Austria to Kazakhstan and Turkmenistan, Tajikistan, Kyrgyzstan is Mr. Wolfgang Banyai

History 

Diplomatic relations between the two countries were established on October 16, 1992, during the signing of a joint communique.

The UN resolution on Turkmenistan's neutrality was developed with the assistance of Austria.

In November 2008, President Gurbanguly Berdimuhamedov visited the Austrian capital of Vienna.

On October 16, 2011, the Austrian Federal President Heinz Fischer visited Turkmenistan.

See also
 Foreign relations of Austria 
 Foreign relations of Turkmenistan

References

External links 
 Botschaft von Turkmenistan
 Österreich-Turkmenische Gesellschaft

 
Turkmenistan
Bilateral relations of Turkmenistan